Ahmed Al-Ghamdi may refer to:
 Ahmed Al-Ghamdi (footballer, born 1994), Saudi Arabian football goalkeeper 
 Ahmed Al-Ghamdi (footballer, born 2001), Saudi Arabian football midfielder